Mecca is an unincorporated community in Clinton County, in the U.S. state of Missouri.

History
A post office called Mecca was established in 1898, and remained in operation until 1912. The name possibly is a transfer from Mecca, a holy city in Islam.

References

Unincorporated communities in Clinton County, Missouri
Unincorporated communities in Missouri